Miriam Rogers (née Spickler; born January 27, 1956) is an American actress. Her notable film roles are Gung Ho (1986), Someone to Watch Over Me (1987), Desperate Hours (1990), and Full Body Massage (1995). She garnered the greatest acclaim of her career for her role in the religious drama The Rapture (1991), with critic Robin Wood declaring that she "gave one of the greatest performances in the history of the Hollywood cinema." Rogers has since appeared in Reflections on a Crime (1994), The Mirror Has Two Faces (1996), Austin Powers: International Man of Mystery (1997), Lost in Space (1998), Ginger Snaps (2000), The Door in the Floor (2004), and For a Good Time, Call... (2012). Her extensive work in television includes Paper Dolls (1984), Weapons of Mass Distraction (1997), The Loop (2006–2007), and recurring roles on The X-Files (1998–1999), Two and a Half Men (2011–2015), Wilfred (2014), Mad Men (2015), Bosch (2014–2021), and Bosch: Legacy (2022).

Early life
Rogers was born Miriam Spickler at General Hospital in Coral Gables, Florida. She is the daughter of Philip C. Spickler, a civil engineer, and Kathy Talent, a former dance and drama major. Rogers's father was Jewish and her mother Episcopalian. Her father became involved with Scientology before she was born, and the organization was part of her upbringing.

The family lived in Virginia, Arizona, Michigan, and England before settling in Los Angeles. At the age of fourteen, Rogers finished her formal education and graduated from high school. She later worked in a hospital for incapacitated patients outside Palo Alto, California, and for six years she worked part-time as a social worker involved in substance-abuse counseling.

At the beginning of their acting careers, Rogers and Kirstie Alley lived together.

Career
After her first marriage ended, Rogers moved to Los Angeles to embark on an acting career. She studied acting with Milton Katselas for nine months and then sought an agent. She screen tested for the lead role in Body Heat which eventually went to Kathleen Turner. Her early television roles included guest spots on Hill Street Blues (1981) as a love interest for officer Andy Renko (Charles Haid), as well as Magnum, P.I. (1982), and Hart to Hart (1983). In 1982, Rogers starred in the made-for-TV-movie Hear No Evil as Meg. She made her feature film debut in the sports comedy Blue Skies Again (1983). Between 1983 and 1984, she worked extensively in television as a series regular on The Rousters and as supermodel Blair Harper-Fenton in Paper Dolls. In 1986, she starred alongside Michael Keaton in Gung Ho.

In 1986, Rogers auditioned for the female lead in Fatal Attraction which went to Glenn Close. However, Rogers got her breakthrough role when she was cast opposite Tom Berenger in Someone to Watch Over Me (1987). Rogers played Claire Gregory, a socialite who is protected after she witnesses a murder. In 1989, she was in The Mighty Quinn starring Denzel Washington. In 1990, she appeared in Desperate Hours.

In 1991, Rogers starred as the protagonist in The Rapture about a woman who converts from a swinger to a born-again Christian after learning that a true Rapture is upon the world. She received an Independent Spirit Award for Best Female Lead nomination for her role in the film. Slant Magazine praised her "spectacular performance, which seems in part inspired by the physical splendors and feral glances of Bette Davis or Barbara Stanwyck."

In 1993, Rogers posed nude for the March 1993 edition of Playboy magazine, and also appeared on that issue's cover. She later explained "Playboy had been after me for years, and finally I agreed to pose when they gave me complete approval over the shoot. It was done in a tasteful way, and since I knew that I wanted to have children soon, I thought it might be nice to have a permanent record of my body in its prime."

In 1994, Rogers starred as a woman on death row in the prison thriller Reflections on a Crime and received the Best Actress prize for the film at the Seattle International Film Festival. New York Magazine praised Rogers's "typically terrific performance" in the film.

Rogers later joined an ensemble cast in the critically acclaimed comedy-drama Trees Lounge (1996). She also had a supporting role alongside Barbra Streisand and Lauren Bacall in The Mirror Has Two Faces (1996). Her next film was the beginning of what would become a major franchise, when she appeared as Mrs. Kensington in Austin Powers: International Man of Mystery (1997).

In 1998, she co-starred in Lost in Space. A year later, she co-produced and co-starred in the Holocaust drama The Devil's Arithmetic. Together with her fellow producers, Rogers received a Daytime Emmy Award nomination for Outstanding Children's Special for the film. Between 1998 and 1999, Rogers also had a recurring role on The X-Files playing Diana Fowley for seven episodes. In 2000, she starred in the critically acclaimed Canadian horror film Ginger Snaps. She was also a series regular on the short-lived ABC series The Geena Davis Show (2000–01).

Rogers later made television appearances on Dawson's Creek (2003) as the mother of Jen Lindley (Michelle Williams) and in Las Vegas (2003). She also appears in the comedy prequel Dumb and Dumberer: When Harry Met Lloyd (2003). In 2004, she starred alongside Jeff Bridges and Kim Basinger in the drama The Door in the Floor. Between 2006 and 2007, Rogers was a series regular on the Fox comedy The Loop playing Meryl. In 2010, Rogers had a guest voice role on King of the Hill and served as a producer on Unstoppable.

In 2010, she performed at the Geffen Playhouse in Love, Loss, and What I Wore. In 2011, she was cast in the recurring role of Robin Schmidt, a primatologist and Ashton Kutcher's mother on Two and a Half Men. Rogers resumed the role in the season 10 premiere episode. In 2012, she made a guest appearance on The Client List, and appeared in the films For a Good Time, Call... and, alongside Meryl Streep, in Hope Springs.

In March 2012, she was cast alongside Chad Michael Murray in the ABC pilot Scruples, as Harriet, a "powerful and vindictive magazine editor".

From 2014 to 2021, she had a recurring role in Bosch. Rogers appears as Honey Chandler, an attorney at odds with the titular character portrayed by Titus Welliver. She has since reprised the role as Honey Chandler in the Amazon Freevee (recently rebranded from IMDb TV) spin-off Bosch: Legacy, which premiered in 2022.

Other ventures
Having played poker as a teenager, Rogers took up competitive poker in 2003 and finished in the money in her first major tournament at the World Poker Tour's 240 player Shooting Stars' main event No-Limit Texas hold 'em tournament in San Jose, California, on March 4, 2004. She is on the board of directors of the World Poker Tour. In July 2006, she finished in the money (33rd place) at the $1000 Ladies' No-Limit Hold 'em World Series of Poker event.

Personal life

Rogers has been married three times. She married James Rogers in 1976 and assumed his surname; they divorced in 1980. She then had a relationship with Emilio Estevez. On May 9, 1987, she married actor Tom Cruise in a New York City ceremony; the marriage broke down at the end of 1989, and a divorce was finalized in February 1990. In January 1990, the couple released a joint statement: "While there have been very positive aspects to our marriage, there were some issues which could not be resolved even after working on them for a period of time." It is believed to be Rogers who introduced Cruise to Scientology.

In an interview with Playboy in 1993, Rogers discussed her split from Cruise and said that he had been considering becoming a monk, which affected their intimacy. Rogers later retracted the comments and claimed she had been misinterpreted.

In 1990, Rogers met her present husband, producer Chris Ciaffa, on the set of the made-for-cable film Fourth Story. The couple has a daughter, Lucy (born 1994) and a son, Charlie (born 2001). They married on March 20, 2003, at the Beverly Hills courthouse. During an interview on The Late Late Show with Craig Kilborn, Rogers joked that the marriage – after 13 years living together and two children – was just so they would be eligible for a country club membership.

Rogers has made campaign contributions to the Democratic Party.

Scientology
Rogers's father became interested in Dianetics in 1952 and later became a prominent Mission Holder with the Church of Scientology and friend of its founder, L. Ron Hubbard. Rogers also reportedly became a highly trained "auditor" with the church. Prior to her acting career, she opened a "field auditing" practice, the Enhancement Center, with her first husband, Jim Rogers. According to Sonny Bono, Rogers was his "auditor" for dianetics. Tom Cruise was also a client before being directed towards a Celebrity Centre.

In an interview given to the Los Angeles Times in 1991, Rogers said about Scientology: "that philosophy was simply part of my upbringing and I liked it. And, I think it was an excellent system of belief to grow up with because Scientology offers an extremely pragmatic method for taking spiritual concerns and breaking them down into everyday applications."

Rogers has left the Church of Scientology and has been described in media reports as a former member of the church.

Cruise biographer Andrew Morton alleged that Rogers's father had been declared a Suppressive Person after leaving the church in the early 1980s, during a cull of Mission Holders.

A 2012 article in Vanity Fair alleged that Rogers held an unfavorable view of the church's controversial leader, David Miscavige. In Going Clear: Scientology, Hollywood, and the Prison of Belief, published in 2013, author Lawrence Wright alleged that Miscavige had pushed Rogers from her marriage with Cruise so the latter could pursue Nicole Kidman.

Filmography

Film

Television films

Television series

References

Sources

External links

 
 

1956 births
Actors from Coral Gables, Florida
Actresses from Florida
American film actresses
American television actresses
American stage actresses
American film producers
American women television producers
American poker players
American people of Jewish descent
Female poker players
Florida Democrats
American former Scientologists
Living people
American women film producers
Television producers from Florida